Allama Iqbal Town (also known as Iqbal Town or abbreviated as AIT) is a commercial and a residential locality in the south-western Lahore.

It is named after Allama Iqbal, the national poet of Pakistan. Development was started in the late 1970s and early 1980s. It was previously famed for its name in Urdu, 'Sola Sau Acre سولہ سو ایکڑ' (meaning 1600 acres), due to its area. Its boundaries are marked by Multan Road to the west and north, and by Wahdat Road to the south.

Iqbal Town has been home to famous actors and actresses of Pakistani film industry, Lollywood. Because the Shahnoor Studios and Bari studios are situated very close to the area, many film actors and actresses used to live here in the past. However, most of them have now moved to the posh suburban areas of the city.

Iqbal town's main boulevard is one of the busiest road of Lahore. It also has a parking plaza in Moon Market.
College block, Pak block, Asif Block, Kashmir block, Huma block and Jahanzeb block are situated on the main boulevard which starts from Multan Road (the intersection famously known as 'Scheme moare'. Moare means corner in the Urdu language) and leads towards Wahdat Road and then the Punjab University campus.

Neighboring localities constitute of Wahdat Colony, Ichhra, Samanabad, Garden Town, Mustafa Town, Sabzazar and Said Pur.
Major commercial markets are Karim Block Market (adjacent to Umer Block and Karim Block) - famous for the garments shops located there) and Moon Market (Dubai Chowk).

The oldest open university in Pakistan Allama Iqbal Open University's Lahore campus is located in Raza Block of Allama Iqbal Town. It also houses the Karim Block Market nearby.

Allama Iqbal Town consists of a total of 22 residential divisions called 'blocks' listed alphabetically:
Asif, Badr, Chenab, College, Gulshan, Huma,Hunza Jahanzeb, Khyber, Kamran, Karim, Kashmir, Mehran, Muslim, Nargis, Neelam, Nishtar, Nizam, Pak, Rachna, Raza, Ravi, Sikander, Sutlej, Umar and Zeenat.

Gulshan-e-Iqbal Park 

This park has been a source of entertainment and enjoyment in the area for almost three decades now. It was opened to general public in April, 1982. Ali Jabbar is a famous personality of this area. The park is known for its vast lush green gardens, enjoyments rides, different food stalls, boating area for paddle and motorboats, an artificial waterfall and an artificial hill for one's climbing and hiking experience. Families spend their holiday time enjoying rides, food and sunlight on winter afternoons. They come in crowds to enjoy the rides, greenery and the shade on summer nights.

Karim Block Market 
The Karim Block Market is a local market area situated in the Karim Block of the town along Wahdat Road. The market contains a number of grocery, retail and garment shops as well as eateries and restaurants. There are also some petrol pumps, a Gourmet Bakery and branches of the Punjab Bank, MCB and Allied Bank Meezan Bank Faysal Bank within the premises of the market. 
Karim Block Market houses many factory outlets including Levis, Outfitters, Minnie and Minors, Shirt and Tie, Royal Tag to name a few. Many shops offer clothing for kids men and women wear at discounted rates round the year. This market caters the need of brand conscious people and low income, salaried people alike.

See also 
 Moon Market
 Gulshan-e-Iqbal Park

References

External links 
 Iqbal Town, City District Government Lahore 

Samanabad Zone
Populated places in Lahore District